Legislative elections were held in France on 25 February and 6 March 1824. The election was an overwhelming victory for Villèle and the ultras, as only 17 MPs of the opposition were re-elected (including Royer-Collard, Cécile Stanilas de Girardin, Benjamin Constant and Maximilien Sébastien Foy).

Electoral system
Only citizens paying taxes were eligible to vote.

Results

References

Legislative elections in France
France
Legislative
France
France